Louis-Jean Malvy (1 December 1875 – 10 June 1949) was the Interior Minister of France in 1914.

Biography
Louis-Jean Malvy was born on 1 December 1875 in Figeac.

Career
Malvy was a member of the Radical Party and served in the Chamber of Deputies as representative of Lot from 1906 to 1919 and from 1924 to 1942. He was sub-secretary of state for Justice from 2–23 June 1911 and sub-secretary of state for the Interior and Religion from 27 June 1911 to 14 January 1912.

Malvy was Minister of Commerce, Industry, Posts and Telegraphs from 9 December 1913 to 16 March 1914, Interior Minister from 17 March 1914 to 31 August 1917 and from 9 March to 15 June 1926. Along with Joseph Caillaux he was charged with treason in 1918 and was exiled for five years.

Death
Malvy died on 10 June 1949 of a heart attack.

References

1875 births
1949 deaths
People from Lot (department)
Politicians from Occitania (administrative region)
Radical Party (France) politicians
French interior ministers
French Ministers of Commerce, Industry, Posts, and Telegraphs
Members of the 9th Chamber of Deputies of the French Third Republic
Members of the 10th Chamber of Deputies of the French Third Republic
Members of the 11th Chamber of Deputies of the French Third Republic
Members of the 13th Chamber of Deputies of the French Third Republic
Members of the 14th Chamber of Deputies of the French Third Republic
Members of the 15th Chamber of Deputies of the French Third Republic
Members of the 16th Chamber of Deputies of the French Third Republic